Bear Country may refer to:

 Bear Country (Disneyland), a themed land at Disneyland
 Bear Country (film), a 1953 American short documentary film
 Bear Country, a fictional country in The Berenstain Bears.
 Bear Country a wrestling tag team currently wrestling in All Elite Wrestling.